Uroobovella is a large genus of mites in the family Urodinychidae.

Species
 Uroobovella advena (Trägårdh, 1912)
 Uroobovella aemulans (Berlese, 1905)
 Uroobovella africana (Oudemans, 1905)
 Uroobovella alascana Wisniewski & Hirschmann, in Wisniewski, Hiramatsu & Hirschmann 1992
 Uroobovella alpina (Schweizer, 1922)
 Uroobovella ambigua Hirschmann, 1979
 Uroobovella andrassyi Hirschmann & Zirngiebl-Nicol, 1972
 Uroobovella anwenjui Ma, 2003
 Uroobovella aokii Hiramatsu, 1979
 Uroobovella appendiculata (Berlese, 1910)
 Uroobovella araucariae Hirschmann, 1972
 Uroobovella assamomarginata Hiramatsu & Hirschmann, 1979
 Uroobovella attaae Hirschmann, 1972
 Uroobovella australiensis Wisniewski & Hirschmann, in Wisniewski, Hiramatsu & Hirschmann 1992
 Uroobovella australiobovata Zirngiebl-Nicol & Hirschmann, 1975
 Uroobovella australiovalis Zirngiebl-Nicol & Hirschmann, 1975
 Uroobovella badia Hirschmann, 1989
 Uroobovella baloghi Hirschmann & Zirngiebl-Nicol, 1962
 Uroobovella belunensis Lombardini, 1962
 Uroobovella berenicea (Berlese, 1910)
 Uroobovella biezankoi Wisniewski & Hirschmann, 1992
 Uroobovella bistellaris (Vitzthum, 1935)
 Uroobovella borealis (Sellnick, 1940)
 Uroobovella bosi (Oudemans, 1903)
 Uroobovella brasiliensis Hirschmann & Zirngiebl-Nicol, 1969
 Uroobovella browningi Ryke, 1958
 Uroobovella bruckii (Berlese, 1916)
 Uroobovella bucovinensis Hutu, 1976
 Uroobovella californiana Wisniewski & Hirschmann, 1992
 Uroobovella carniolensis (Willmann, 1941)
 Uroobovella cassida Fox, 1948
 Uroobovella catharciphorae (Chinniah & Mohanasundaram, 1999)
 Uroobovella cavernosa Hiramatsu, 1979
 Uroobovella cayamasiana Wisniewski & Hirschmann, in Wisniewski, Hiramatsu & Hirschmann 1992
 Uroobovella ceylonensis Zirngiebl-Nicol & Hirschmann, 1975
 Uroobovella ceylonivarians Zirngiebl-Nicol & Hirschmann, 1975
 Uroobovella changbaiensis (Ma, 1985)
 Uroobovella cienfuegi Wisnewski & Hirschmann, 1992
 Uroobovella cooremani Hirschmann, 1979
 Uroobovella coprophila (Womersley, 1960)
 Uroobovella coriacea (Athias-Binche, 1980)
 Uroobovella coronata (Berlese, 1916)
 Uroobovella costaisimilis Wisniewski, 1980
 Uroobovella costal Hirschmann & Zirngiebl-Nicol, 1972
 Uroobovella crassescens Hirschmann, 1981
 Uroobovella crenelata Hirschmann & Zirngiebl-Nicol, 1962
 Uroobovella cribraria (Ewing, 1909)
 Uroobovella cristobalensis Hirschmann, 1979
 Uroobovella crustosa (Vitzthum, 1926)
 Uroobovella cubana Wisnewski & Hirschmann, 1992
 Uroobovella cylindrica (Berlese, 1913)
 Uroobovella cylliboides (Hull, 1923)
 Uroobovella daelei Hirschmann, 1981
 Uroobovella dampfi (Oudemans, 1913)
 Uroobovella delumbis Hirschmann & Hiramatsu, 1990
 Uroobovella denticulata Hirschmann & Zirngiebl-Nicol, 1972
 Uroobovella difoveolata Hirschmann & Zirngiebl-Nicol, 1962
 Uroobovella dryocoetis (Vitzthum, 1923)
 Uroobovella endicellae Wisniewski, 1980
 Uroobovella enodis Hiramatsu, 1985
 Uroobovella erlangensis Hirschmann & Zirngiebl-Nicol, 1962
 Uroobovella euris (Türk & Türk, 1952)
 Uroobovella europaea Hirschmann & Zirngiebl-Nicol, 1962
 Uroobovella expressa Hiramatsu & Hirschmann, 1983
 Uroobovella faceta Hiramatsu & Hirschmann, 1978
 Uroobovella facetaoides Hiramatsu & Hirschmann, 1978
 Uroobovella feideri Hutu, 1976
 Uroobovella fibulata Hirschmann & Zirngiebl-Nicol, 1972
 Uroobovella fimicola (Berlese, 1903)
 Uroobovella fimicolasimilis Hirschmann & Zirngiebl-Nicol, 1972
 Uroobovella fistulata Hiramatsu, 1982
 Uroobovella flagelliger (Berlese, 1910)
 Uroobovella flagelligerformis Hirschmann, 1979
 Uroobovella flammea Hirschmann & Zirngiebl-Nicol, 1972
 Uroobovella folsomi (Ewing, 1909)
 Uroobovella foraminifera (Berlese, 1903)
 Uroobovella foraminosa Hiramatsu, 1979
 Uroobovella formosana Phillipsen & Coppel, 1978
 Uroobovella fortis Hiramatsu & Hirschmann, 1983
 Uroobovella foveolata Hirschmann & Zirngiebl-Nicol, 1972
 Uroobovella foveolatasimilis Hiramatsu, 1980
 Uroobovella fracta (Berlese, 1916)
 Uroobovella franzi Hirschmann & Zirngiebl-Nicol, 1962
 Uroobovella fungivora Hirschmann & Zirngiebl-Nicol, 1962
 Uroobovella furcigera (Vitzthum, 1935)
 Uroobovella ghanae Wisniewski, 1981
 Uroobovella gressitti Hirschmann & Zirngiebl-Nicol, 1972
 Uroobovella guaraniana Wisniewski & Hirschmann, 1992
 Uroobovella hamata Hirschmann, 1979
 Uroobovella haradai Hiramatsu, 1979
 Uroobovella hiramatsuiflagelliger Hirschmann, 1989
 Uroobovella hirschmanni Wisniewski, 1979
 Uroobovella hortensia Karg, 1989
 Uroobovella hummelincki (Sellnick, 1963)
 Uroobovella hungarica Hirschmann & Zirngiebl-Nicol, 1962
 Uroobovella hutuae Wisniewski, 1980
 Uroobovella ikezakii Hiramatsu & Hirschmann, 1978
 Uroobovella imadatei Hiramatsu, 1980
 Uroobovella incerta Hiramatsu & Hirschmann, 1978
 Uroobovella incertaoides Hiramatsu & Hirschmann, 1978
 Uroobovella inhaerens (Vitzthum, 1921)
 Uroobovella insignis Hirschmann & Zirngiebl-Nicol, 1962
 Uroobovella ipidis (Vitzthum, 1923)
 Uroobovella ipidisimilis Hirschmann & Zirngiebl-Nicol, 1962
 Uroobovella isabellae Wisniewski, 1981
 Uroobovella ishigakiensis Hiramatsu, 1979
 Uroobovella ishikawai Hiramatsu, 1979
 Uroobovella itoi Hiramatsu & Hirschmann, 1977
 Uroobovella japanocrenelata Hiramatsu & Hirschmann, 1978
 Uroobovella japanomarginata Hiramatsu, 1979
 Uroobovella japanovarians Hiramatsu & Hirschmann, 1978
 Uroobovella japonica Hiramatsu & Hirschmann, 1977
 Uroobovella javae Wisniewski, 1981
 Uroobovella jerzyi Buhlmann, 1980
 Uroobovella johnstoni (Indira, Rao, Thakur & Raj, 1980)
 Uroobovella katmanduana Wisniewski & Hirschmann, 1991
 Uroobovella kneissli Hirschmann & Zirngiebl-Nicol, 1962
 Uroobovella kraussei Zirngiebl-Nicol, 1972
 Uroobovella kurosai Hiramatsu, 1979
 Uroobovella laotana Wisniewski & Hirschmann, in Wisniewski, Hiramatsu & Hirschmann 1992
 Uroobovella leleupi (Driel, Loots & Marais, 1977)
 Uroobovella levigata Hirschmann & Hiramatsu, 1990
 Uroobovella levis Pearse, Patterson, Rankin & Wharton, 1936
 Uroobovella ligulaformis Hirschmann, 1979
 Uroobovella limatula Hiramatsu, 1979
 Uroobovella limpida Hiramatsu & Hirschmann, 1983
 Uroobovella litteri (Khan, 1968)
 Uroobovella longiseta (Deb & Raychaudhuri, 1965)
 Uroobovella longitricha Wisniewski & Hirschmann, 1992
 Uroobovella luzonensis Hiramatsu & Hirschmann, in Wisniewski, Hiramatsu & Hirschmann 1992
 Uroobovella lyriformis Hirschmann, 1973
 Uroobovella madagascariensis Wisniewski & Hirschmann, in Wisniewski, Hiramatsu & Hirschmann 1992
 Uroobovella makilingensis Hirschmann & Hiramatsu, 1990
 Uroobovella marginata (C.L. Koch, 1839)
 Uroobovella matskasii Hirschmann, 1981
 Uroobovella mazatlana Hirschmann, 1979
 Uroobovella meridiana Hiramatsu, 1978
 Uroobovella mesoafricana Wisniewski & Hirschmann, in Wisniewski, Hiramatsu & Hirschmann 1992
 Uroobovella mexicana Hirschmann, 1979
 Uroobovella micherdzinskii Hirschmann & Zirngiebl-Nicol, 1972
 Uroobovella michiganensis (Vitzthum, 1926)
 Uroobovella minagawai Hiramatsu, 1981
 Uroobovella minima (Koch, 1841)
 Uroobovella mitakensis Hiramatsu & Hirschmann, 1977
 Uroobovella miyatakei Hiramatsu, 1979
 Uroobovella moseri Hirschmann, 1972
 Uroobovella mrciaki Masan, 1999
 Uroobovella multidentata Hiramatsu, 1983
 Uroobovella nahuelbutaensis Hirschmann, 1973
 Uroobovella nantouensis Hiramatsu & Hirschmann, in Wisniewski, Hiramatsu & Hirschmann 1992
 Uroobovella neoamericana Hirschmann, 1972
 Uroobovella neohirschmanni Hiramatsu, 1978
 Uroobovella neohortensia Wisniewski & Hirschmann, 1991
 Uroobovella neokurosai Hiramatsu, 1980
 Uroobovella neosudanensis Hiramatsu, 1981
 Uroobovella neovarians Hiramatsu, 1981
 Uroobovella nipponica (Kishida, 1949)
 Uroobovella nitida Hiramatsu, 1981
 Uroobovella nitidissima (Berlese, 1916)
 Uroobovella nostras Berlese, 1918
 Uroobovella notabilis Berlese, 1903
 Uroobovella nova (Oudemans, 1902)
 Uroobovella novasimilis Hiramatsu, 1979
 Uroobovella novateutoniae Hirschmann, 1981
 Uroobovella novus (Oudemans, 1902)
 Uroobovella obovata (G. Canestrini & Berlese, 1884)
 Uroobovella ogasawaraensis Hiramatsu, 1979
 Uroobovella okinawaensis Hiramatsu, 1979
 Uroobovella ornata Hirschmann, 1981
 Uroobovella orri Hirschmann, 1972
 Uroobovella orrioides Hirschmann, 1981
 Uroobovella orrisimilis Zirngiebl-Nicol & Hirschmann, 1975
 Uroobovella ortleppi (Ryke, 1958)
 Uroobovella ovalis Hirschmann & Zirngiebl-Nicol, 1962
 Uroobovella papuensis Hiramatsu, 1980
 Uroobovella parva Hiramatsu & Hirschmann, 1977
 Uroobovella passali Wisniewski & Hirschmann, 1993
 Uroobovella pauxilla Hiramatsu & Hirschmann, 1981
 Uroobovella pauxillaoides Hiramatsu & Hirschmann, 1981
 Uroobovella pearsi (Wharton, 1938)
 Uroobovella pectinata (Hirschmann, 1973)
 Uroobovella pectinatasimilis Hiramatsu, 1980
 Uroobovella penicillata (Leitner, 1947)
 Uroobovella pergibba (Berlese, 1905)
 Uroobovella perlucida Hirschmann & Hiramatsu, 1990
 Uroobovella peruana Wisniewski & Hirschmann, 1992
 Uroobovella petiti (Coineau & Trave, 1964)
 Uroobovella plaumanni (Sellnick, 1962)
 Uroobovella porosa Wisniewski & Hirschmann, 1993
 Uroobovella portalis Hirschmann, 1973
 Uroobovella portalisimilis Hirschmann, 1981
 Uroobovella posnaniensis Wisniewski & Hirschmann, in Wisniewski, Hiramatsu & Hirschmann 1992
 Uroobovella postdorsalis Karg, 1989
 Uroobovella pulchella (Berlese, 1904)
 Uroobovella pygorana Wisniewski & Hirschmann, 1992
 Uroobovella pyriformis (Berlese, 1920)
 Uroobovella rackei (Oudemans, 1912)
 Uroobovella rectangula (Berlese, 1913)
 Uroobovella reticulata (Willmann, 1941)
 Uroobovella rotundaobovella Hirschmann, 1981
 Uroobovella rubella (Athias-Binche, 1980)
 Uroobovella ruehmi Hirschmann, 1972
 Uroobovella samoae (Hirst, 1927)
 Uroobovella scelerum (Vitzthum, 1926)
 Uroobovella schulzi (Willmann, 1959)
 Uroobovella sellnickiamericana Hirschmann, 1979
 Uroobovella sellnickicylindrica Hirschmann, 1979
 Uroobovella sellnickivillosella Hirschmann, 1979
 Uroobovella serangensis Hiramatsu, 1980
 Uroobovella setosa Pearse, Patterson, Rankin & Wharton, 1936
 Uroobovella shikokuensis Hiramatsu, 1979
 Uroobovella shiratsuensis Hiramatsu, 1979
 Uroobovella similimitakensis Hiramatsu & Hirschmann, 1981
 Uroobovella similiobovata Hirschmann & Zirngiebl-Nicol, 1962
 Uroobovella similiovalis Hiramatsu & Hirschmann, 1979
 Uroobovella similizairensis Hirschmann, 1981
 Uroobovella slovaca Masan, 1999
 Uroobovella spinosa Pearse, Patterson, Rankin & Wharton, 1936
 Uroobovella spinulipes (Canestrini, 1884)
 Uroobovella stercorea Hiramatsu & Hirschmann, 1978
 Uroobovella stricta Hirschmann & Zirngiebl-Nicol, 1972
 Uroobovella stylifera (Trägårdh, 1952)
 Uroobovella subvitrea Karg, 1989
 Uroobovella sudanensis Hirschmann & Zirngiebl-Nicol, 1972
 Uroobovella sugiyamai Hiramatsu, 1979
 Uroobovella sumatrensis (Vitzthum, 1921)
 Uroobovella takakii Hiramatsu, 1980
 Uroobovella tamena Hirschmann, 1979
 Uroobovella tasmanica (Womersley, 1955)
 Uroobovella teres Hiramatsu, 1980
 Uroobovella texana Wisniewski & Hirschmann, 1992
 Uroobovella tokyoensis Hiramatsu, 1979
 Uroobovella topali Hiramatsu & Hirschmann, 1981
 Uroobovella treati Hirschmann, 1980
 Uroobovella tridens Hirschmann & Zirngiebl-Nicol, 1972
 Uroobovella vallei (Sellnick, 1959)
 Uroobovella varians Hirschmann & Zirngiebl-Nicol, 1962
 Uroobovella variseta Wisniewski & Hirschmann, 1994
 Uroobovella venusta (Berlese, 1916)
 Uroobovella vietnamensis Hirschmann, 1981
 Uroobovella vietnamvarians Hirschmann, 1981
 Uroobovella villosella Berlese, 1913
 Uroobovella vinicolora (Vitzthum, 1926)
 Uroobovella vitzthumi Hirschmann & Zirngiebl-Nicol, 1962
 Uroobovella vulgaris Hirschmann & Zirngiebl-Nicol, 1972
 Uroobovella weigmanni Hiramatsu, 1978
 Uroobovella wichmanni (Vitzthum, 1923)
 Uroobovella yasumanensis Hiramatsu, 1981
 Uroobovella zairensis Hirschmann, 1981
 Uroobovella zicsii Hirschmann & Zirngiebl-Nicol, 1972

References

Mesostigmata